Wawaka Lake is a small lake by Halcottsville in Delaware County, New York. It is located north-northeast of Margaretville. The East Branch Delaware River flows through the lake.

See also
 List of lakes in New York

References 

Lakes of New York (state)
Lakes of Delaware County, New York